This is a season-by-season list of records compiled by Michigan State in men's ice hockey.

The Michigan State Spartans have won three NCAA Championship in their history.

Season-by-season results

Note: GP = Games played, W = Wins, L = Losses, T = Ties

* Winning percentage is used when conference schedules are unbalanced.

Footnotes

References

 
Lists of college men's ice hockey seasons in the United States
Michigan State Spartans ice hockey seasons